Type 24 may refer to:
 Bristol Braemar Type 24, British heavy bomber aircraft
 Nieuport Type 24, French biplane fighter aircraft
 Peugeot Type 24, motor vehicle by the French auto-maker Peugeot
 Type 24 heavy machine gun, Chinese version of the MG 08
 Type 24 pillbox, a British WW II defence structure
 Type 24 rifle (Chiang Kai-shek rifle), Chinese version of the German Mauser Gewehr 98
 Type 24 torpedo boat, a class of torpedo boat built for the German Navy